Tara Jaff is a Kurdish musician  who has been exposed to many ancient influences. Over the years, Jaff experimented with different string instruments, but it was her fascination with the ancient harps of Sumeria, Assyria, Hurrians and Elam, dating as far back as 3000 BC that led her to the contemporary Celtic harp. She has embraced this instrument and introduced to modern Kurdish music, particularly in modern folk songs. Having  developed her own innovative style to adapt to the various musical rhythms and modes of the region, Jaff brings a contemporary expression to an ancient form of music and song. 

Jaff has been living in the United Kingdom since 1976 and has performed widely, mainly as a solo artist, in concerts, festivals, galleries, conferences as well having appeared regularly on radio and television worldwide. Her occasional collaborations have been with a range of artists such as film-makers, story-tellers, poets, and painters. Jaff is also involved in outreach work where she takes her harp to hospitals to play soothing music for patients and staff.

Albums
 Diley Dêwanem, Kom Müzik, 2006.
Asewar (Dialogue of Harp and Ney), 2012.
Tembur and Harp, 2015

References

1958 births
Living people
Kurdish musicians
Musicians from Baghdad
Iraqi Kurdish women
Iraqi emigrants to the United Kingdom
Kurdish-language singers
Harpists
Women harpists
Kurdish women singers